Medicine Hat Public Library (MHPL) is a public library located in Medicine Hat, Alberta, Canada. It sits atop the beautiful South Saskatchewan River, situated on Treaty 7, Treaty 4, and Métis Nation Region 3 territory. MHPL is a member of the Shortgrass Library System and The Alberta Library.

The library is located in Medicine Hat's downtown core, across the street from the Esplanade Arts and Heritage Centre and next to the Court of Queen’s Bench on First Street S.E.

Services
FREE library cards for Medicine Hat residents
Any public library patron in good standing at any Alberta public library can borrow materials like books, movies, music, video games, and more
Information and reference services
Access to online resources like eBooks, audiobooks, magazines, newspapers, online learning courses, language learning courses, Ancestry, Consumer Reports, and study help for children in grades 3 -12
Community information and resources, including an in-house Social Worker 
Internet access including wireless
Reader's advisory services
Programs for children, youth and adults
Delivery to homebound individuals
Services for print-disabled and vision impaired
Interlibrary loans

General information

The dual-level facility features a children’s library, dedicated young adult section, adult fiction, movies, music and audiobooks on the upper level.  The main checkout, self-checkout kiosks and the Information & Memberships counter are located on this level as well.

The lower level is home to the reference collection, adult non-fiction, periodicals, microfilm readers and public computer terminals.  The 150-seat theatre and both the Honor Currie and Legion meeting rooms and Training Room are also found on this level. Rent a room at the Library.

In 2015 the Medicine Hat Public Library celebrated 100 years of service in Medicine Hat. To recognize the significance of the library to the community of Medicine Hat, Mayor Ted Clugston declared November 21 as "MHPL Day."

Partnerships
Medicine Hat Public Library is a member of "The Alberta Library", a province-wide system that allows access to material from every member library in Alberta.

Energy conservation
The City of Medicine Hat installed a one kilowatt solar electric system on the roof of the library during the summer of 2006.  The building now draws part of its electricity from the solar panel. Power generation from the 1 kW solar panel array is performing as expected.  The historical measurements of the solar array are within expectations consistent with theoretical calculations used in methods provided by the National Renewable Energy Laboratory. In the first 5 years of operation, the solar array generated 5-6 thousand kWh. Not considering upfront capital and installation costs, the total associated electrical energy consumption savings are approximately $600–800 over the same time period. The amount of electricity generated can also be viewed in real time. The project cost approximately $15k.

Statistics 2015

Library In-person Visits: 247,894
Items Borrowed: 210,409 items circulated 527,159 times
Library Members: 14,809
Programs: 654
Program Participants: 19,149
Public Internet Use: 23,907 sessions
Reference questions Answered:  5,996
Volunteers: 315 donated 1,433 hours

References

External links
Medicine Hat Public Library
Shortgrass Library System
The Alberta Library
Canadian Library Association

Public libraries in Alberta
Medicine Hat
Libraries established in 1915
1915 establishments in Canada